Montague Chambers QC (November 1799 – 18 September 1885) was an English lawyer and Liberal Party politician who sat in the House of Commons in two periods between 1852 and 1874.

Chambers was the son of George Chambers, son of the architect Sir William Chambers and his wife Jane Rodney, daughter of Admiral the 1st Baron Rodney. He was educated at the Royal Military College, Sandhurst, and served in the Grenadier Guards.

In February 1828, he was called to the bar at Lincoln's Inn. He became editor of "The Law Journal" in 1835. He went on the Home circuit and in 1845 was appointed a Queen's Counsel. He was a bencher of his inn and a member of the Royal Institution.

Chambers stood unsuccessfully for parliament at Greenwich at a by-election in February 1852, but was elected as a member of parliament (MP) for Greenwich at the general election in July 1852. He was defeated at the 1857 general election. In 1865 he stood unsuccessfully for parliament at Bedford. He was elected an MP for Devonport at a by-election on 22 May 1866, and held the seat until he stood down from the Commons at the 1874 general election.

Chambers died in the Fulham district at the age of 85.

References

External links

 

1799 births
1885 deaths
Graduates of the Royal Military College, Sandhurst
Grenadier Guards officers
Liberal Party (UK) MPs for English constituencies
Members of Lincoln's Inn
19th-century King's Counsel
UK MPs 1852–1857
UK MPs 1865–1868
UK MPs 1868–1874